Oenothera curtiflora (syn. Gaura parviflora), known as velvetweed, velvety gaura, downy gaura, or smallflower gaura, is a species of flowering plant native to the central United States and northern Mexico, from Nebraska and Wyoming south to Durango and Nuevo Leon.

Taxonomy
The species remains widely known as Gaura parviflora, this name being published in 1830 and for a long time considered the correct name for the species. However, an overlooked but validly published name G. mollis had been published earlier by Edwin James in 1823. A proposal was made to conserve the name G. parviflora over G. mollis, and this was accepted by the International Botanical Congress Committee for Spermatophyta, so G. parviflora remains the correct name. The name G. mollis appears in some sources.

Description
It is an annual plant growing to 0.2–2 m (rarely 3 m) tall, unbranched, or if branched, only below the flower spikes.

Uses
Among the Zuni people, fresh or dried root would be chewed by medicine man before sucking snakebite and poultice applied to wound.

Introduction
It is naturalized and often invasive in other parts of the United States, and in Australia, China, Japan, and South America.

References

curtiflora
Flora of North America
Plants used in traditional Native American medicine